Supercross 3D is an off-road motorcycle racing video game developed by Tiertex Design Studios and published by Atari Corporation exclusively for the Atari Jaguar first in North America on December 15, 1995 and later in Europe on December 20 of the same year. Themed around motocross, the players compete in races across fourteen cities of United States such as San Jose, Dallas, Orlando, Florida, Indianapolis, Atlanta and Seattle.

Gameplay 

Supercross 3D is an off-road motocross racing game that uses a behind the motorcycle perspective and is presented with pre-rendered sprites on a 3D environment with minimal texture mapping. Players can choose from any of the five riders before starting and customize it by entering their name nationality, team and setup. The players control their bike by using the D-pad and can accelerate, slide, stop and decelerate. Holding down allows the player to have more air in jumps, while holding up aims the front wheel forward to land on slopes. Players can also tilt the bike to the side while in the air to adjust the angle at which they hit the ground or turns and perform tricks in the air. There are five levels of difficulty to choose from and the default control scheme can be changed at the options screen. Records and other settings made by the player are saved automatically via the cartridge's internal EEPROM, though progress in Tournament mode is saved manually after completing the final race of each track.

The game features three different gameplay modes to choose from at the main menu: Practice, Race and Tournament. Practice mode is recommended for newcomers to refine their skills. Race is an arcade-style mode where players compete against seven CPU-controlled opponents across any of the available tracks to choose from, with each race consisting of two qualifying rounds and the final round. Players also have the option to take a practice round before the start of each race. Tournament is a competition mode where players participate in races across fourteen cities from United States, starting on San Jose and finishing on Seattle. It is structured similarly as Race mode, with each tracks consisting of three rounds where players compete against other opponents for qualification, but the practice round is excluded before the start of any race.

Development and release 
Supercross 3D was originally listed for a September 1995 release before being pushed back to December. The game makes use of SGI-rendering for the bike riders, which all of them were created by using advanced kinematics and wavefront modeling, giving them a more sharper appearance. This marked a technological advancement for Atari Corp., as it was one of the first titles for the system to make use of the SGI technology. It was also showcased during the Fun 'n' Games Day event hosted by Atari.

Reception 

Supercross 3D received negative reception, with most reviewers criticizing its low framerate. Next Generation reviewed the Jaguar version of the game, and stated that "The game could be greatly improved with smoother animation, to say the least. But for now it's difficult to find a star small enough to rate this game."

Notes

References

External links 
 
 Supercross 3D at AtariAge
 Supercross 3D at GameFAQs
 Supercross 3D at MobyGames

1995 video games
Atari games
Atari Jaguar games
Atari Jaguar-only games
Motorcycle video games
Off-road racing video games
Racing video games
Single-player video games
Tiertex Design Studios games
Video games set in California
Video games set in Florida
Video games set in Georgia (U.S. state)
Video games set in Indiana
Video games set in North Carolina
Video games set in Texas
Video games set in the United States
Video games set in Washington (state)
Video games developed in the United Kingdom